Chris Lowrey (born 15 August 1986) is a New Zealand rugby union footballer who plays for Toyota in the Japanese Top League. He previously played for Auckland in the Air New Zealand Cup and the Blues in the Super Rugby competition. His playing positions are number eight and flanker. Lowrey won the Blues "Rookie of the year" honours in 2009.

Lowrey played club rugby for Ponsonby, where he won the 2007 Auckland Club Player of the Year Award. He also competed for the New Zealand Colts against Canada in 2007. Lowery is a former student of Mount Albert Grammar School where he was Head Boy (2004) and captain of the First XV Rugby Team.

External links
Blues player profile
Lowrey quits Blues

1986 births
Living people
Rugby union players from Auckland
Blues (Super Rugby) players
Auckland rugby union players
Toyota Industries Shuttles Aichi players
New Zealand rugby union players
Rugby union flankers
Rugby union number eights
New Zealand expatriate rugby union players
Expatriate rugby union players in Japan
New Zealand expatriate sportspeople in Japan